Rabu′ (also spelled Rabho) is a Syrian village located in the Masyaf Subdistrict in Masyaf District, located west of Hama. According to the Syria Central Bureau of Statistics (CBS), Rabu′ had a population of 2,288 in the 2004 census.

Rabu' is the site of the ancient Assyrian fortress town of Aribna, part of Lubama. It was where the Assyrian emperor Ashurnasirpal I lodged when the Lukuti area was ravaged.

The tomb of a holy man who was widely venerated in the Masyaf area is located in Rabu'. According to local folklore, "only a man with a clear conscience" could pass through its entrance.

References

Bibliography

Populated places in Masyaf District